Moratgi  is a village in the southern state of Karnataka, India. It is located in the Sindgi taluk of Bijapur district in Karnataka.

Demographics
 India census, Moratgi had a population of 5403 with 2760 males and 2643 females.

See also
 Bijapur district
 Districts of Karnataka

References

External links
 http://Bijapur.nic.in/

Villages in Bijapur district, Karnataka